Bridgend railway station served the town of Bridgend, in the historical county of Glamorganshire, Wales, from 1864 to 1873 on the Bridgend Branch.

History 
The station was opened on 25 February 1864 by the Llynvi and Ogmore Railway. It was a short-lived terminus, only being open for nine years before it closed on 1 July 1873. The services were diverted to the current  station.

References 

Disused railway stations in Bridgend County Borough
Railway stations in Great Britain opened in 1861
Railway stations in Great Britain closed in 1873
1864 establishments in Wales